Samuel Dwight "Sam" Hanks (July 13, 1914 – June 27, 1994) was an American race car driver who won the 1957 Indianapolis 500.  He was a barnstormer, and raced midget and Championship cars.

Racing career
Hanks was born in Columbus, Ohio and lived in Alhambra, California from the age of six.  He attended Alhambra High School.

Hanks won his first championship in 1937 on the West Coast in the American Midget Association (AMA).  He barnstormed the country, racing on the board tracks at Soldier Field in Chicago.  Hanks reportedly won the first two board track races at Soldier Field in 1939.  He won the 1940 VFW Motor City Speedway championship in Detroit.

After World War II, Hanks captured the 1946 United Racing Association (URA) Blue Circuit Championship.  He won the 1947 Night before the 500 midget car race.  He was the 1949 AAA National Midget champion.  He won the 1953 AAA National Championship in the Bardahl Special.  He won the 1956 Pacific Coast championship in the USAC Stock cars.

Hanks considered retiring following the 1956 Indianapolis 500, but agreed to return for the 1957 race at the urging of car owner George Salih.  He would win in 1957 in his 13th attempt (the most tries of any Indy winner) and announced his retirement from racing in Victory Circle.  He did not stop racing immediately following his victory, however, but completed his contract to run a stock car for the remainder of the 1957 season.

He drove the pace car at the Indianapolis 500 from 1958 to 1963.

Hanks is believed to be the only Indianapolis 500 driver to participate in the race before World War II, serve in the war effort, then return to race again after the war.  It has also been conjectured that Hanks may have been a distant relative to Abraham Lincoln.

Having experienced ill health for three years, Hanks died at his home in Pacific Palisades, California on June 27, 1994, aged 79.

Awards
He was inducted in the National Sprint Car Hall of Fame in 1998.
He was inducted in the Motorsports Hall of Fame of America in 2000.
Hanks was inducted in the National Midget Auto Racing Hall of Fame in 1984.
Hanks was inducted in the West Coast Stock Car Hall of Fame in 2005.

Complete AAA/USAC Championship Car results

Indianapolis 500 results

* Shared drive with Duane Carter

World Championship career summary
The Indianapolis 500 was part of the FIA Formula One World Championship from 1950 through 1960. Drivers competing at Indy during those years were credited with World Championship points and participation. Sam Hanks participated in eight F1 World Championship races. He started on the pole zero times, won one race, set zero fastest laps, and finished on the podium four times. He accumulated a total of 20 championship points.

Television appearance
Hanks portrayed himself in the episode "The Comedians" of the CBS situation comedy Mr. Adams and Eve, starring Ida Lupino and Howard Duff.  The episode aired on November 8, 1957.

References

1914 births
1994 deaths
Sportspeople from Columbus, Ohio
Racing drivers from Ohio
Racing drivers from Los Angeles
Champ Car champions
Indianapolis 500 drivers
Indianapolis 500 winners
AAA Championship Car drivers
Formula One race winners
National Sprint Car Hall of Fame inductees
USAC Stock Car drivers